Handball event at the 2016 South Asian Games was held at the Indoor Hall of North-East Regional Centre of LNIPE, Guwahati (India) from 10 February to 15 February 2016. In this tournament, 6 teams participated in the men's competition while 7 teams participated in the women's competition.

Referees
7 referee pairs were selected by South Asian Handball Federation while 1 pair was nominated by Asian Handball Federation.

Medalists

Medal table

Draw

Men

Group A
 (Defending Champion)
 

Group B
 (Host)

Women

Group A
 (Host)

Group B

Final standing

Men

Women

References

External links
Official website

2016 South Asian Games
 
Events at the 2016 South Asian Games
2016
South Asian Games
2016 South Asian Games